The songs on Sings the Best of Jimmy Webb 1967–1992 are single and album tracks recorded by Glen Campbell between 1967 and 1992, all written, as the title indicates, by Jimmy Webb.

Track listing
 "Galveston" - 2:40
 "Wichita Lineman" - 3:06
 "By the Time I Get to Phoenix" - 2:43
 "Just Another Piece of Paper" - 2:10
 "Where's the Playground Susie" - 2:56
 "Didn't We" - 3:46
 "Honey Come Back" - 2:58
 "Just This One Time" - 3:46
 "You Might as Well Smile" - 3:35
 "The Moon's a Harsh Mistress" - 3:07
 "Wishing Now" - 3:16
 "Ocean in His Eyes" - 3:27
 "It's a Sin When You Love Somebody" - 2:24
 "I Keep It Hid" - 3:27
 "Adoration" - 3:16
 "Highwayman" - 3:02
 "This Is Sarah's Song" - 2:35
 "I Was Too Busy Loving You" - 3:08
 "Still Within the Sound of My Voice" - 4:08
 "For Sure, For Certain, For Always" - 3:16
 "Lightning in a Bottle" - 4:04
 "If These Walls Could Speak" - 2:58
 "Light Years" - 3:47
 "Only One Life" - 4:05

Production
All songs written by Jimmy Webb
Compiled by Peter Shillito, Kevin Mueller, Glenn A. Baker
Annotated by Stephen Thomas Erlewine
Mastered by Warren Barnett, The Raven Lab
Design and Layout by Louise Cook/Louiville Graphics
Photographs by Glenn A. Baker/original albums

References 

2006 compilation albums
Glen Campbell compilation albums